The Bärensteine is a massif in the state of Saxony in eastern Germany near Weißig. It comprises the two rock formations known as the Großer and Kleiner Bärenstein (the "Great" and "Little Bear Rock") in Saxon Switzerland.

On the Kleiner Bärenstein there used to be a panorama restaurant that belonged to the manor house at Thürmsdorf. It was plundered in the years following the Second World War and demolished.

See also
 Kleiner Bärenstein, the Little Bear Rock
 Großer Bärenstein, the Great Bear Rock

Notes and references

External links 

Mountains of Saxon Switzerland
Rock formations of Saxon Switzerland